To be distinguished from Jean Le Fèvre, bishop of Chartres 1380-1389, Jean Le Fèvre (canon) and Jean Le Fevre de Saint-Remy 1420-1435
Jean Le Fèvre (9 April 1652 – 1706, Paris) was a French astronomer and physicist. He was editor of the Connaissance des Temps and was elected to the French Academy of Sciences based on this work.

References

1652 births
1706 deaths
17th-century French astronomers
French physicists
Members of the French Academy of Sciences
People from Lisieux
18th-century French astronomers